Cipullo is a surname. Notable people with the surname include:

Aldo Cipullo ( 1942–1984), Italian-born American jeweler
Tom Cipullo (born 1956), American composer